Homage to Peace  is an album by free jazz band Emergency originally released in 1973 on the French America label and reissued on CD in 2004 by Universal France. This date was the first recording by American saxophonist Glenn Spearman, who moved to Paris in 1972 and co-founded this international quintet with bassist Bob Reid along with French guitarist Boulou Ferre and two Japanese musicians: pianist Takashi Kako and drummer Sabu Toyozumi.

Reception

In his review for AllMusic, Thom Jurek states "A true, fiery blowout of honk and skronk, Spearman observes the dictums of his teacher Frank Wright, and attempts to turn his horn inside out. This is a must for anyone who is interested in the development of free jazz in the 1970s."

Track listing

 "Emergency Theme" (Gency) – 15:22  
 "People in Sorrow" (Roscoe Mitchell) – 7:57   
 "Kako Tune" (Takashi Kako) – 11:32   
 "Infidels" (Bob Reid) – 9:34

Personnel
Glenn Spearman – tenor saxophone, soprano saxophone
Takashi Kako –piano
Boulou Ferré – electric guitar
Bob Reid – bass
Sabu Toyozumi – drums

References

1973 live albums
Glenn Spearman live albums
America Records live albums